The 1999 Monaco Grand Prix (formally the LVII Grand Prix Automobile de Monaco) was a Formula One motor race held on 16 May 1999 at the Circuit de Monaco in Monte Carlo, Monaco. It was the fourth race of the 1999 Formula One season. The 78-lap race was won by Ferrari driver Michael Schumacher after starting from second position. It was Schumacher's 16th win with Ferrari, breaking the record held by Niki Lauda. His team-mate Eddie Irvine finished second with Mika Häkkinen third for the McLaren team.

The race was Schumacher's second win of the season, his fourth at Monaco, and the result meant that he extended his lead in the Drivers' Championship, to eight points over Irvine and twelve over Häkkinen. Ferrari extended their lead in the Constructors' Championship, twenty-four points ahead of McLaren and twenty-eight ahead of Jordan with 12 races of the season remaining.

Report

Background
The Grand Prix was contested by eleven teams, each of two drivers. The teams, also known as constructors, were McLaren, Ferrari, Williams, Jordan, Benetton, Sauber, Arrows, Stewart, Prost, Minardi and BAR. Tyre supplier Bridgestone brought four different tyre types to the race: two dry compounds, the extra soft and the soft, and two wet-weather compounds, the intermediate and full wet.

Going into the race, Ferrari driver Michael Schumacher led the Drivers' Championship with 16 points, ahead of Eddie Irvine on 12 points and Mika Häkkinen on 10 points. Heinz-Harald Frentzen was fourth with 10 points while Ralf Schumacher was fifth on 10 points. In the Constructors' Championship Ferrari were leading with 28 points, McLaren and Jordan were second and third with 16 and 13 points respectively, while Williams with 7 and Stewart with 6 points contended for fourth place. Ferrari had so far dominated the championship, winning two out of the three previous races, with Häkkinen winning the Brazilian Grand Prix. Championship contenders Frentzen and David Coulthard had each gained one second-place finish, and Ralf Schumacher and Rubens Barrichello had achieved third place podium finishes.

Following the San Marino Grand Prix on 2 May, several teams conducted testing sessions at circuits around the world. Ferrari and Minardi headed for Fiorano where testing for the set-up around the Monaco circuit took place. McLaren and Prost tested at the Circuit de Nevers Magny-Cours running over the course of three days, while Prost elected to test for one day. Jordan tested at the Lurcy-Lévis test track with driver Andrew Gilbert-Scott performing aerodynamic mapping runs.

Practice and qualifying

Four practice sessions were held before the race; two one-hour sessions on Thursday and two 45 minutes sessions on Saturday. The Friday sessions were held in dry and cloudy conditions. Irvine was the fastest driver in the first session, with a time of 1:18.910 that was less than six-tenths of a second faster than Michael Schumacher. Jordan driver Damon Hill was less than two-tenths of a second off Michael Schumacher's pace, with Barrichello, Alessandro Zanardi and Jean Alesi rounding out the top six. In the second practice session, Michael Schumacher was fastest with a time of 1:22.718, ahead of Häkkinen, Olivier Panis, Irvine, Giancarlo Fisichella and Coulthard.

Saturday's afternoon qualifying session lasted for an hour. During this session, the 107% rule was in effect, which necessitated each driver set a time within 107% of the quickest lap to qualify for the race. Each driver was limited to twelve laps. Häkkinen achieved his fourth pole position of the season, his second at the Circuit de Monaco, with a time of 1:20.547. He was joined on the front row of the grid by Michael Schumacher, who was less than one-tenth of a second behind.

Race
The conditions for the race were dry with the air temperature  and the track temperature . The drivers took to the track at 09:30 (GMT +1) for a 30-minute warm-up session. Both Ferrari drivers maintained their good pace from qualifying; Michael Schumacher set the fastest time, a 1:23.792. Irvine was second in the other Ferrari car. Both McLaren drivers were just off Irvine's pace—Häkkinen ahead of Coulthard—while Hill and Ralf Schumacher rounded out the top six.

Both Ferraris gained a position at the start, with Michael Schumacher taking the lead from Mika Häkkinen, Eddie Irvine and David Coulthard. The order remained this way until lap 35 when Coulthard's car began to slow, eventually causing him to retire. Further bad luck befell McLaren a few laps later when Häkkinen went straight on at Mirabeau from oil left after Toranosuke Takagi's blown engine. Eddie Irvine moved into 2nd place and stayed there.

On the podium, the Republic of Ireland's flag was erroneously flown for Irvine instead of the British one.

Post-race
The race result left Michael Schumacher extending his lead in the Drivers' Championship with 26 points. Irvine's second place ensured that he maintained second position in the Championship with 18 points, four points ahead of Häkkinen and five ahead of Frentzen. In the Constructors' Championship, Ferrari extended their lead to 44 points, McLaren maintained second with 20 points, with Jordan maintaining third with 16 points, with 12 races of the season remaining.

Classification

Qualifying

Race

Championship standings after the race

Drivers'      Championship standings

Constructors'      Championship standings

 Note:  Only the top five positions are included for both sets of standings.

References

External links

Monaco Grand Prix
Monaco Grand Prix
Grand Prix
May 1999 sports events in Europe